The Hanga Roa Stadium is a football stadium in Hanga Roa, the capital Easter Island a territory of Chile.  It is the home ground of the CF Rapa Nui, the Easter Island football team.  The stadium holds about 1,000 people.

References
Football-Lineups

Hanga Roa
Hanga Roa
Buildings and structures in Easter Island
Sports venues in Valparaíso Region